Sand Hills is an unincorporated community located within South Brunswick Township in Middlesex County, New Jersey, United States. The settlement is named for Sand Hills, a small group of diabase hills which contains Middlesex County's highest point. The settlement is located approximately at the intersection of U.S. Route 1 (US 1), Sand Hills Road, and Major Road. There is a small cluster of houses and small businesses on Major Road just south of US 1 while more housing developments are found on the north side of the highway. Fast food restaurants, stores, and repair shops line US 1 through the area; this area of US 1 also has large inclines on both sides of the hills to climb from the relatively low and flat areas of the Atlantic coastal plain.

References

South Brunswick, New Jersey
Unincorporated communities in Middlesex County, New Jersey